Cham Kalgeh is a village in Hendijan-e Gharbi Rural District, in the Central District of Hendijan County, Khuzestan Province, Iran. At the 2006 census, its population was 402, in 89 families.

References 

Populated places in Hendijan County